Discovery Science is a Canadian English language specialty channel owned by CTV Specialty Television Inc. (a joint venture between Bell Media and ESPN Inc.) in partnership with Warner Bros. Discovery airing science-related programming.

History
Discovery Science was licensed by the Canadian Radio-television and Telecommunications Commission (CRTC) on December 14, 2000 as Discovery Civilization Channel Canada. The application was granted to CTV Inc., and was later transferred to its subsidiary, CTV Specialty Television Inc., in which ESPN owns a 20% interest. The channel was originally described in regulatory documents as "a national English-language Category 2 specialty television service dedicated to bringing the diverse people and cultures of the world to Canadian viewers. The service will be dedicated to exploring and understanding the roots of human development and learning from other cultures and traditions."

The channel was launched on August 15, 2001 as Discovery Civilization Channel, with programming devoted to human civilization and history. The channel was intended to be a Canadian version of an American channel of the same name, which was later reformatted and renamed Discovery Times, and later became Investigation Discovery.

On June 4, 2010 CTVglobemedia announced that Discovery Civilization Channel would be rebranded as Discovery Science on September 27, 2010, focusing on science-related programming.

HD feed
On June 17, 2011 Bell Media announced that it would launch Discovery Science HD, a high definition (HD) simulcast of the standard definition feed, by the end of 2011. The channel was launched on December 15, 2011 on Bell Fibe TV and on September 11, 2012 on Telus Optik TV. Shaw Direct began using it on August 8, 2018.

International distribution 
 Jamaica – distributed on Flow Cable systems.
 Bahamas – distributed on Cable Bahamas systems.
 Trinidad and Tobago – distributed on Flow Cable systems.
 Brazil – distributed on NET systems.
 Chile – distributed on VTR Digital Cable systems.
 Mexico – distributed on Cablevision

References

External links 
 

Television channels and stations established in 2001
Digital cable television networks in Canada
Bell Media networks
Canada
English-language television stations in Canada
2001 establishments in Canada